The University of Montenegro Faculty of Architecture (Montenegrin: Arhitektonski fakultet Univerziteta Crne Gore Архитектонски факултет Универзитета Црне Горе) is one of the educational institutions of the University of Montenegro. The building is located in Podgorica, at the University campus.

History
The Architecture Department was founded in 2002, as part of the Faculty of Civil Engineering in Podgorica. In 2006, the Faculty of Architecture was relocated to a separate building and established as an independent educational institution of the University. The Faculty is one of the youngest technical colleges in Montenegro.

Organization

The Faculty of Architecture is an educational and scientific institution which organizes undergraduate, specialist and postgraduate studies as well as doctoral studies within its main activities.

Undergraduate studies
Undergraduate studies are organized on one department of the Faculty:
 Architecture

Specialist studies
Specialist studies are organized on the following 2 departments of the Faculty
 Department of Design
 Department of Urbanism

Postgraduate studies
Postgraduate studies are organized on 7 departments:
 Architectural Space Organization
 Interior Space Architecture
 Constructive Systems
 Urbanistic Space Organization
 Projects and Investment in Construction Management
 Protection and Revitalization of Architectural Heritage
 Bioclimatic and Energetically Efficient Architecture

Library
The Library of the Faculty of Architecture has been established as an organizational unit of the Faculty in January 2007. At the beginning, it had a very small number of books at its disposal. For the short time, the fund significantly increased thanks to the resources that the Faculty has allocated for purchase of expert literature, as well as donations of individual professors, teachers and institutions.

Currently, the library is home to more than 2000 library units.

References

Architecture
Montenegro
Montenegro
Architecture
2006 establishments in Montenegro